George Harper may refer to:

George Harper (MP) (1503–1558), in 1545 MP for Kent
George Harper (British Army officer) (1865–1922), British general during the First World War
George Harper (pitcher) (1866–1931), Major League Baseball pitcher
George Harper (outfielder) (1892–1978), Major League Baseball outfielder
George Harper (cricketer, born 1865) (1865–?), English cricketer
George Harper (cricketer, born 1988), American born English cricketer
George Harper (cyclist) (born 1992), English cyclist
George Harper (rugby union) (1867–1937), New Zealand rugby union player
George Harper (footballer) (1877–1914), English footballer
George Harper (lawyer) (1843–1937), New Zealand lawyer
George B. Harper (1918–1988), member of the New Jersey Senate
George Mills Harper (1914–2006), American academic